The Orvin Mountains constitute a major group of mountain ranges, extending for about  between the Wohlthat Mountains and the Mühlig-Hofmann Mountains in Queen Maud Land.

Discovery and naming
First photographed from the air and roughly plotted by the Third German Antarctic Expedition (1938-1939), led by Capt. Alfred Ritscher. Mapped by Norwegian cartographers from surveys and air photos by the Sixth Norwegian Antarctic Expedition (1956–60) and named for Anders K. Orvin, director of the Norwegian Polar Institute from 1958 to 1959.

Constituent ranges
Constituent ranges of Orvin Mountains, listed from east to west:
 Shcherbakov Range
 Mount Dallmann
 Conrad Mountains
 Gagarin Mountains
 Kurze Mountains
 Drygalski Mountains
 Filchner Mountains

See also
 List of mountains of Queen Maud Land
 Skorvehallet Slope

References

 
Mountain ranges of Queen Maud Land